The 1939 VFL Grand Final was an Australian rules football game contested between the Melbourne Football Club and Collingwood Football Club, held at the Melbourne Cricket Ground in Melbourne on 30 September 1939. It was the 41st annual Grand Final of the Victorian Football League, staged to determine the premiers for the 1939 VFL season.

The match
The match, attended by 78,110 spectators, was won by Melbourne by a margin of 53 points, marking that club's third premiership victory and first since winning the 1926 VFL Grand Final.

The teams

 Umpire - Alan Coward/Bill Blackburn

Statistics

Goalkickers

See also
 1939 VFL season

References
AFL Tables: 1939 Grand Final

External links

VFL/AFL Grand Finals
Grand
Melbourne Football Club
Collingwood Football Club
September 1939 sports events